Count Me Out is a 1997 Icelandic comedy film directed by Ari Kristinsson. The film was selected as the Icelandic entry for the Best Foreign Language Film at the 71st Academy Awards, but was not accepted as a nominee.

Cast
 Bergþóra Aradóttir as Hrefna
 Freydís Kristófersdóttir as Yrsa
 Edda Heidrún Backman as Yrsa's mom
 Halldóra Björnsdóttir as Hrefna's mom
 Maria Ellingsen as Pálina
 Bergsveinn Eyland as Kerru strákur
 Halldóra Geirharðsdóttir as Margrét 'Magga'

See also
 List of submissions to the 71st Academy Awards for Best Foreign Language Film
 List of Icelandic submissions for the Academy Award for Best Foreign Language Film

References

External links
 

1997 films
1997 comedy films
Icelandic comedy films
1990s Icelandic-language films